Carlos Enrique Pineda López (born 23 September 1997) is a Honduran professional footballer who plays as a defensive midfielder for Olimpia and the Honduras national team.

Club career
Pineda made his debut for C.D. Olimpia on 14 February 2016, coming off the bench in the 70th minute for Óscar Salas in a 4–0 win over C.D.S. Vida.

Before the start of the 2017 Apertura tournament, Pineda joined Lobos UPNFM on a season-long loan. He made his debut on 15 October 2017 in a 3–2 away victory against Real C.D. España.

On 9 January 2019, Pineda was loaned to C.D. Real de Minas for six months.

Honours
Honduras Youth
 Pan American Silver Medal: 2019

References

External links
 
 

1997 births
Living people
Association football forwards
Honduran footballers
C.D. Olimpia players
C.D. Real de Minas players
Lobos UPNFM players
Honduras international footballers
Sportspeople from Tegucigalpa
Footballers at the 2019 Pan American Games
Pan American Games silver medalists for Honduras
Pan American Games medalists in football
Honduras under-20 international footballers
Medalists at the 2019 Pan American Games
Liga Nacional de Fútbol Profesional de Honduras players
Footballers at the 2020 Summer Olympics
Olympic footballers of Honduras